Gesche is a feminine given name and a surname. People with the name include:

Given name
 Gesche Gottfried (1785–1831), German serial killer
 Gesche Joost (born 1974), German design researcher
 Gesche Schünemann (born 1982), German Paralympic basketball player
 Gesche Würfel (born 1976), German visual artist

Surname
 Adolphe Gesché (1928–2003), Belgian Catholic priest and theologian
 Bruno Gesche (1905–1980), German military officer
 Paul Gesche (1907–1944), German communist and resistance fighter

Surnames of German origin
German feminine given names